Barry Earl Beckham (born March 19, 1944) is an American playwright and novelist.

Biography
Beckham was born in 1944 in Philadelphia to Clarence and Mildred (née William) Beckham. At the age of nine, he moved with his mother to a Black neighborhood in Atlantic City, New Jersey. He graduated from Atlantic City High School and in 1962 he entered Brown University as one of only eight Black students in the freshman year and one of three black graduates in 1966.

He began his first novel, My Main Mother (1969), while in his senior year at Brown University. Beckham completed the novel at the age of 25 in 1969. He graduated in 1966 with a degree in English. His second novel, Runner Mack (1972), was nominated for a National Book Award.

His play Garvey Lives!, about Jamaican-born Black Nationalist Marcus Garvey, was produced by George Houston Bass of the Rites and Reason Theatre, a Black theater group at Brown University.

Beckham returned to Brown in 1970 as a visiting lecturer in English and African American Studies. He had a 17-year career at the university, including several years as the head of the graduate creative writing program.

References

External links 

1944 births
20th-century American novelists
African-American novelists
American male novelists
Brown University alumni
Brown University faculty
Writers from Atlantic City, New Jersey
Writers from Philadelphia
African-American dramatists and playwrights
American dramatists and playwrights
Living people
20th-century American male writers
Novelists from Pennsylvania
Novelists from New Jersey
People from Atlantic City, New Jersey
Atlantic City High School alumni
20th-century African-American writers
21st-century African-American people
African-American male writers